Emil Jonassen Sætervik (born 17 February 1993) is a Norwegian footballer who is a free agent. 

He started playing for local club Odd at the age of five, and made his way to the first team.

Career statistics

Club

References

External links

Odd Grenland profile

1993 births
Living people
Sportspeople from Skien
Norwegian footballers
Norway youth international footballers
Association football defenders
Eliteserien players
Norwegian First Division players
Odds BK players
FK Bodø/Glimt players
FC BATE Borisov players
Stabæk Fotball players
Norwegian expatriate footballers
Expatriate footballers in Belarus
Norwegian expatriate sportspeople in Belarus
21st-century Norwegian people